Pseudancistrus depressus is a species of catfish in the family Loricariidae. It is a freshwater fish native to South America, where it is known only from Suriname, reportedly occurring in the Coppename River. The species reaches 13 cm (5.1 inches) in total length.

References 

Fish described in 1868
depressus